Count Alphonse de Toulouse-Lautrec Driving His Mail-Coach is a painting by Henri de Toulouse-Lautrec of his father, a great lover of horses recognisable by his beard, completed in 1881 at the age of only 17 years. It is now in the Petit Palais in Paris.

The work is highly influenced by equestrian scenes by Crafty and by British and American engravings of horse-teams. It is signed in the bottom right hand corner "HTL, Souvenir de la Promenade des Anglais". The painter stayed on the Côte d'Azur several times due to his bad health and is inspired by Nice.

References

Paintings by Henri de Toulouse-Lautrec
Horses in art
1881 paintings
Paintings in the collection of the Petit Palais